Bandar-e Anzali County is in Gilan province, Iran. The capital of the county is the city of Bandar-e Anzali. At the 2006 census, the county's population was 130,851 in 38,810 households. The following census in 2011 counted 138,004 people in 45,080 households. At the 2016 census, the county's population was 139,016 in 48,193 households.

Bandar Anzali County is bordered by the Caspian Sea on the north, Sowme'eh Sara County on the south, Khomam County on the east, Rasht County on the southeast, and Rezvanshahr County on the west.

Administrative divisions

The population history of Bandar-e Anzali County's administrative divisions over three consecutive censuses is shown in the following table. The latest census shows one district, two rural districts, and one city.

References

 

Counties of Gilan Province